Podvinci is a village in the Municipality of Ptuj in northeastern Slovenia. It lies just northeast of Ptuj. The area is part of the traditional region of Styria. It is now included with the rest of the municipality in the Drava Statistical Region.

References

External links
Podvinci at Geopedia

Populated places in the City Municipality of Ptuj